Otto Canella (born in the middle of the 11th century, died in 1143) was Consul of the Republic of Genoa in 1133, and an  ancestor of the House of Grimaldi, the family that currently rules Monaco. According to the 19th-century historian Gustave Saige, Canella's eldest son, Bellamuto, was also a Consul of Genoa, even nine years before Canella himself achieved the position. The Princely Family of Monaco take their name, Grimaldi, from his youngest son Grimaldo. Grimaldo became a Consul of Genoa in 1162.

Anne Edwards writes: "They were an ambitious tribe, greedy for power within Genoa, always with an eye toward their own enrichment. The family, who were Ghibellines in the long struggle between the popes (Guelfs) and the emperors (Ghibellines), were pitted against the Doria and Spinola families on the Guelf side."

References

1070s births
1143 deaths
11th-century Genoese people
12th-century Genoese people
House of Grimaldi
11th-century Italian nobility
12th-century Italian nobility